The  is a railway line in Hokkaido operated by Hokkaido Railway Company (JR Hokkaido), connecting Numanohata, Tomakomai and Shiroishi Station in Shiroishi-ku, Sapporo, linking the Muroran Main Line and Hakodate Main Line. There also is a branch line to New Chitose Airport.

Service outline
The line forms part of the trunk route between Sapporo and Southern Hokkaido. As such, Hokuto limited express trains run between Sapporo and Hakodate once every 1 to 2 hours, as well as the Suzuran limited express between Sapporo and Muroran.

The section between Sapporo and Minami-Chitose is also a part of the trunk route between Sapporo and eastern Hokkaido. The limited express trains Ōzora and Super Tokachi run through.

The rapid trains Special Rapid Airport and Rapid Airport run approximately once every 12 minutes, functioning as the airport rail link between New Chitose Airport Station and Sapporo or Otaru. Since the Chitose Line goes through the most urbanized area in Hokkaido, there are roughly 3 to 4 local train services per hour.

Former services
There were sleeper trains between Honshu and Hokkaido, such as the Hokutosei, Cassiopeia, Twilight Express, and Hamanasu.

Station list
SRA: Special Rapid Airport
RA: Rapid Airport
L: Local
All rapid trains stop at stations signed "+", some at "◌", and all skip stations marked "-". Local trains stop at most stations but some skip stations signed "◌".

Airport Branch Line

Closed station 

 H15 : Closed since 4 March 2017, now a signal base.

Rolling stock
 721 series EMUs
 731 series EMUs
 733 series EMUs
 735 series EMUs

History

The entire line opened on 21 August 1926.

Duplication
The Chitose-Eniwa section was double-tracked in September 1965, and extended to Kitahiroshima in September 1966.

The Chitose-Uenae section was double-tracked in 1968, and extended to Numanohata in 1969.

The Shiraishi-Kitahiroshima section was double-tracked in 1973, completing the work to double-track the line.

Electrification
Chitose Station and its approaches were elevated in 1980, and the line was electrified in association with the opening of the nearby Chitose airport.

The Minami-chitose—Chitose Airport branch opened as an electrified line in 1992.

See also
Hakodate Main Line
Muroran Main Line
Airport rail link
List of railway lines in Japan

References

External links 
 

Rail transport in Hokkaido
Lines of Hokkaido Railway Company
Airport rail links in Japan
Railway lines opened in 1926
1926 establishments in Japan